Tamás Iváncsik (born 3 April 1983 in Győr) is a Hungarian handballer.

The winger participated on four European Championships (2006, 2008, 2010, 2012) and represented Hungary on further three World Championships (2007, 2009, 2011).

Personal
His father, Mihály Iváncsik is a former handball player, who has won the IHF Cup in 1986 and has received silver medal on the World Cup in the same year.

He has two brothers, Gergő Iváncsik and Ádám Iváncsik. Both of them are professional handball players and Hungarian internationals.

He is married. Her wife, Fatouma gave birth to their first daughter, Naima in December 2011 and to their second, Natali in October 2014.

Achievements
Nemzeti Bajnokság I:
Winner: 2008, 2009, 2010, 2011, 2012, 2013, 2014
Bronze Medalist: 2007
Magyar Kupa:
Winner: 2009, 2010, 2011, 2012, 2013, 2014
Finalist: 2007, 2008
EHF Cup Winners' Cup:
Winner: 2008
EHF Champions Trophy:
Finalist: 2008

Individual awards
 Junior Príma díj (2008)
 Hungarian Handballer of the Year: 2008

References

External links
 Tamás Iváncsik player profile on MKB Veszprém KC official website
 Tamás Iváncsik career statistics at Worldhandball

1983 births
Living people
Hungarian male handball players
Sportspeople from Győr
Hungarian expatriate sportspeople in Romania
Expatriate handball players